Saad Specialist Hospital, often abbreviated as SSH, is a private hospital in Khobar, Saudi Arabia. It initially owned and operated by the Saad Group, founded in 2001 by a businessman, Maan Abdul Wahed Al-Sanea. SSH is a JCI accredited hospital.  As of 2020, it is managed by SA International.

History
Saad Specialist Hospital was founded as Saad Specialist Clinic on 1997, although their first patient was only admitted in 2001. It has a 600-bed capacity.

The Saad Group went into debt and closed in 2017.   The hospital is currently managed by SA International.

Certification
Saad Specialist Hospital has received accreditation from the Joint Commission International (JCI), The Canadian Council on Health Services Accreditation (CCHSA), and The Australian Council on Healthcare Standards International (ACHSI).

Saad College of Nursing and Allied Health Sciences
The Saad College of Nursing and Allied Health Sciences is located on the hospital grounds. It was established in a unique partnership program with the University of Ulster.

The College’s mission is to: "...be a leading academic institute for young Saudi women wishing to pursue a career in the nursing profession".

References

Hospitals established in 1997
Hospitals in Saudi Arabia
Hospital buildings completed in 2001
Private hospitals in Saudi Arabia